Ulises Alejandro Dávila Plascencia (born 13 April 1991) is a Mexican professional footballer who plays as an attacking midfielder for A-League club Macarthur FC whom he captains.

Club career

Guadalajara
Born in Guadalajara, Jalisco, Dávila was champion with Guadalajara in the category 1990–91 in the National Youth Championship in July 2006, with a 1–0 win over Pachuca, where he scored the only goal. That same year, Chivas also won the Manchester United Premier Cup "Generation 1991", beating Arsenal by a score of 2–1. In the 2008–09 season he was on loan at affiliate club Tapatio scoring three goals in eighteen matches in the Primera División A.

He made his debut for Guadalajara in the Primera División on 29 August 2009, in a 2–2 draw against Pachuca. Dávila also featured in five matches in the Copa Libertadores tournament.

Chelsea
On 27 August 2011, it was announced that Dávila had signed for English club Chelsea, signing a five-year contract, making him the first Mexican to sign with Chelsea.

Loan to Vitesse
On 30 August 2011, it was announced that Dávila joined Dutch football club Vitesse Arnhem on loan for the 2011–12 season. He was given the number 24 jersey. He made his club debut against Roda JC Kerkrade on 17 September 2011, with the game ending in a 5–0 win for Vitesse. Unlike his teammate from Chelsea, Tomáš Kalas, Dávila struggled to get into the starting XI and had been an unused substitute for a number of games. Playing for their reserve side, he had more success, scoring three goals in three games. On 19 February 2012, once again returned onto the bench against FC Twente but was an unused sub, the game ended in a 1–4 loss for Vitesse. On 28 April 2012, again returned onto the bench against Excelsior but again was an unused sub, the game ended in a 3–2 win for Vitesse. Dávila spent the majority of his time at Vitesse with the reserve squad.

Loan to Sabadell
On 13 July 2012 CE Sabadell announced that Dávila will join them on loan for the 2012–13 season. On 29 September 2012, Dávila scored his first league goal against Guadalajara, winning the game 2–1. On 18 November Dávila scored a brace against Recreativo de Huelva, and also hit the post almost scoring his first hat trick, Sabadell won the game 5–2 away.

Loan to Córdoba
On the last day of the 2013 Summer transfer window, Chelsea confirmed that Dávila was having a medical at Córdoba CF of the Spanish Segunda División. Later on that day he secured his deal on a season-long loan.

On 23 June, he scored an equaliser in injury time away to UD Las Palmas in the second leg of the play-off final, earning Córdoba's promotion to La Liga for the first time in 42 years.

Loan to Vitória Setubal
On 23 January 2015, Dávila ended his loan with Tenerife to join the Portuguese side on loan for the rest of the season.
On 3 August 2015, it was announced that Dávila will remain with Vitória for the 2015–2016 season.

Santos Laguna
On 4 December 2015, Santos Laguna announced they had purchased Dávila from Chelsea and signed him to a three-year contract.

Delhi Dynamos
In December 2018, Dávila signed with Indian Super League side Delhi Dynamos, and scored his only goal on 17 February 2019, against Bengaluru FC in a 3–2 win.

Wellington Phoenix
In July 2019, Dávila signed with A-League side Wellington Phoenix on a two-year deal. Dávila secured a 4th goal in 6 starts with a goal from outside the box against Brisbane Roar on 23 November 2019. The goal proved vital in their 2–1 victory, Wellington's first win of the 2019–20 A-League season. Dávila helped the Phoenix to its best ever regular season finish, ending in 3rd place for the League, before the team lost 0–1 to Perth Glory FC in their first game of the elimination finals. Dávila finished the season with 12 goals and five assists, winning the Johnny Warren Medal along with Miloš Ninković.

Macarthur FC
On 17 May it was announced that Davila had signed a three-year deal to join Macarthur FC for the 2021–22 season. On 6 November 2021, Dávila was announced as the captain for the 2021–22 A-League Men season.

International career

Youth
Dávila was part of the under-20 side that played the 2011 CONCACAF U-20 Championship, in which Mexico finished as champions. He also participated in the 2011 Toulon Tournament in France, where Mexico finished as fourth place losing to Italy in a penalty shoot-out. Dávila scored two goals during the 2011 Toulon Tournament, scoring against France and Hungary.

Dávila was part of the 20-man squad that participated in the 2011 FIFA U-20 World Cup in Colombia. Mexico would eventually finish third in the tournament by beating France 3–1, and he was able to score a goal against France.

Senior
Dávila received his first call up to the senior national team to play the 2011 Copa América, to replace one of the five players that were suspended for having disciplinary problems in Quito, Ecuador. He did not play in any of Mexico's matches.

Personal life
In March 2020, Dávila's wife Lily Pacheco gave birth to a son. On 30 May 2022, Lily passed away.

Career statistics

Club

Honours
Santos Laguna
Liga MX: Clausura 2018

Macarthur FC
Australia Cup: 2022

Mexico U20
CONCACAF U-20 Championship: 2011

Individual
A-League Player of the Month: November 2019, December 2019
A-League PFA Team of the Season: 2019–20, 2020–21, 2021–22
PFA Footballer of the Year: 2020–21
Johnny Warren Medal: 2020–21
Mark Viduka Medal: 2022

References

External links

1991 births
Living people
Footballers from Guadalajara, Jalisco
Mexican footballers
Association football midfielders
C.D. Guadalajara footballers
Chelsea F.C. players
SBV Vitesse players
CE Sabadell FC footballers
Córdoba CF players
CD Tenerife players
Vitória F.C. players
Santos Laguna footballers
Wellington Phoenix FC players
Macarthur FC players
Liga MX players
Eredivisie players
Segunda División players
Primeira Liga players
Indian Super League players
A-League Men players
Mexico youth international footballers
Mexico under-20 international footballers
2011 Copa América players
Mexican expatriate footballers
Mexican expatriate sportspeople in the Netherlands
Mexican expatriate sportspeople in Spain
Mexican expatriate sportspeople in Portugal
Mexican expatriate sportspeople in New Zealand
Mexican expatriate sportspeople in Australia
Expatriate footballers in the Netherlands
Expatriate footballers in Spain
Expatriate footballers in Portugal
Expatriate association footballers in New Zealand
Expatriate soccer players in Australia
Mexican expatriate sportspeople in India
Expatriate footballers in India
Odisha FC players